Emiroğlu is a Turkish surname. Notable people with the surname include:

İpek Emiroğlu (born 1992), Turkish football referee
Selma Emiroğlu (1928–2011), Turkish cartoonist and opera singer
Sema Emiroğlu (born 1967), Turkish journalist
Nazife Emiroğlu (born 1970), Founder & CEO EmirogluTrans

Turkish-language surnames